Dávic Kovács (born 18 June 1991) is a Hungarian football forward who plays for OTP Bank Liga club Budafoki MTE.

Career statistics
.

References

External links
 
 

1991 births
Living people
Hungarian footballers
Association football forwards
Nemzeti Bajnokság I players
Footballers from Budapest
Budafoki LC footballers